William Gretton (1736–1813), was the master of Magdalene College, Cambridge.

Gretton was the son of John Gretton of Bond Street, London, born in 1736, and educated at St. Paul's School and Peterhouse, Cambridge, where he graduated B.A. in 1758 and proceeded M.A. in 1761. Having taken holy orders, he was presented in 1766 to the vicarage of Saffron Walden, Essex.

In 1784 Lord Howard de Walden appointed him his domestic chaplain. He was subsequently presented to the rectory of Littlebury, Essex, of which county he was in the commission of the peace, and was made Archdeacon of Essex on 2 December 1795. In 1797 he was elected master of Magdalene College, Cambridge, and was vice-chancellor of the university in 1800-1. He died on 29 September 1813.

References

1736 births
1813 deaths
18th-century English people
19th-century English people
Alumni of Peterhouse, Cambridge
Archdeacons of Essex
People from Mayfair
English Christian religious leaders
English chaplains
Masters of Magdalene College, Cambridge
Vice-Chancellors of the University of Cambridge
Clergy from London